Melese klagesi is a moth of the family Erebidae. It was described by Walter Rothschild in 1909. It is found in French Guiana, Suriname and Venezuela.

References

 

Melese
Moths described in 1909